Grishchenkov (masculine) or Grishchenkova (feminine) is a Russian surname. Notable people with the surname include:

Alla Grishchenkova (born 1961), Russian Soviet swimmer
Nina Grishchenkova, Russian rower
Vasiliy Grishchenkov (born 1958), Russian Soviet triple jumper

See also
 Grishchenko

Russian-language surnames